The Protein–RNA Interface Database (PRIDB) is a database of protein–RNA interfaces extracted from the Protein Data Bank.

See also
 RNA-binding protein
 Protein Data Bank

References

External links
 http://bindr.gdcb.iastate.edu/PRIDB.

Biological databases
RNA-binding proteins
RNA